The Austin Eighteen is a large saloon car, supplied in two different wheelbases to carry five or seven passengers, that was introduced by Austin on 14 July 1937. Its engine and front seat were mounted nine inches (225 mm) further forward than on the old York Sixteen it replaced. The chassis was also extended three inches (75 mm) to provide a total of twelve inches (300 mm) more passenger space. One result was a relatively short bonnet and a good driving position. Its new shape followed the lines of the other Austin cars introduced the previous autumn and it was remarkable for having a completely flat floor in both front and rear passenger compartments with exceptionally wide doors and draught-free ventilation.

Chassis
The engine and gearbox unit had four live rubber mountings and the silencer and exhaust pipe were similarly insulated. The frame was rigidly cross braced with the deep side members dropped in order to give a low body mounting. Where the cross bracings ran into the side members they were welded to form a box section which gave stiffness.

Engine
The engine, carried forward from the 18 h.p. York model of the Sixteen had received small improvements which increased the engine's output. 
The engine benefited from improvements to the 12hp engine found in the new Ascot of 1936. The crankshaft is supported on 4 bearings and the main and big end bearings are of the shell type. The 1938 season engine benefited from higher compression, bigger valves and an aluminium cylinder head with thermostat fitted. These often cracked upon removal.

Gearbox
Austin own design 4 speed with syncromesh on 2nd, 3rd and top (dog clutch). Borg and Beck dry plate clutch and 2 piece propshaft, supported in a central rubber-mounted bearing.

Braking
Braking is provided through Girling rod brakes, with a similar design found on the Austin 14 Goodwood.

Steering
The steering column was adjustable for length. The steering system by Marles-Weller had been improved. Because the engine had moved forward the track rod was now forward of the front axle.

Suspension
The low periodicity half-elliptical springs were zinc interleaved with oilite self-lubrication discs at the end of the main leaves. Oil could be fed between the leaves by grease gun through a nipple under each spring.

Road test
The Windsor car, roomy and well-proportioned, has unusually wide and deep side-windows. . . . There are two good-sized suitcases in the boot above a separate compartment for the spare wheel and tyre and room for extra luggage on the platform made by the open boot door. . . . Seating is generous and head clearance "most satisfactory". The folding occasional seats are comfortable within their limits. . . ."The engine is much helped by the latest (cylinder) head towards a greater and smoother delivery of power". Acceleration and speed was rated as adequate in view of the reliable and economical usage for which the car was intended. The brakes were "powerful".Motoring Correspondent, The Times

References

External links

 Landaulette by Gordon & Co of Taunton Road, Sparkbrook, Birmingham
 Norfolk 1938
 Norfolk
 Windsor 1938
 Windsor interior
 Windsor driving seat
 Windsor leaving
 Off-Road Iver or Windsor

18
Cars introduced in 1937
Rear-wheel-drive vehicles
Sedans